North Absheron Operating Company (NAOC) was an international petroleum consortium based in Baku, Azerbaijan created to explore and develop the Dan Ulduzu and Ashrafi prospects in the Azerbaijani sector of the Caspian Sea. The company started its operations in 1997. On March 7, 2000 the company stopped operations after the management of company considered the contract was not financially profitable.

Overview
NAOC was in charge of managing operations for Dan Ulduzu-Ashrafi bloc. The consortium consisted of operator Amoco (acquired by BP) (30%) and partners SOCAR (20%), Itochu (20%), Unocal (25.5%), Delta Oil Company (4.5%). The 25-year PSA agreement between Azerbaijani government and the companies was signed on December 14, 1996 and ratified by the Azerbaijani Parliament on February 25, 1997.

The first exploration well Ashrafi-1 was drilled in February 1998. The results indicated 620,000 cm and 3,400 bbl per day.

Although the estimated investment foreseen for the project was $2 billion, over the period of exploration operations the company spent only a total of $64.5 million. The initial right for development of the field was granted to Amoco and Unocal in 1992. The other partners joined in mid-1990s.

Humanitarian projects in Azerbaijan
NAOC was also involved in charity and humanitarian projects in Azerbaijan. The consortium paid for construction of housing for 100 Azerbaijani families that became refugees and IDPs displaced from their homes during the first Nagorno-Karabakh War. The housing complex is located in Mingachevir city. Construction of five community centers for refugees were also funded by NAOC through Relief International. Partial funding was also extended to Counterpart International for assistance with supplies for orphanages.

See also

Dan Ulduzu field
Ashrafi field
Azeri-Chirag-Guneshli
SOCAR

References

External links
Location of Azerbaijani oil fields from Azerbaijan International magazine
State Oil Company of Azerbaijan Republic Official Site
BP Official Site

Defunct oil and gas companies of Azerbaijan
Caspian Sea
Itochu